Sepedonophilus attemsii is a species of centipede in the Scolopendridae family. It is endemic to Australia, and was first described in 1925 by German myriapodologist Karl Wilhelm Verhoeff.

Description
The original description of this species is based on female specimens ranging from 23 mm to 36 mm in length with 53 or 55 pairs of legs.

Distribution
The species occurs in north-eastern Queensland.

Behaviour
The centipedes are solitary terrestrial predators that inhabit plant litter, soil and rotting wood.

References

 

 
attemsii
Centipedes of Australia
Endemic fauna of Australia
Fauna of Queensland
Animals described in 1925
Taxa named by Karl Wilhelm Verhoeff